South Carolina Highway 419 (SC 419) is a  state highway in the U.S. state of South Carolina. The highway connects rural areas of Calhoun County with Fort Motte.

Route description
SC 419 begins at an intersection with SC 267 (McCords Ferry Road) southeast of Fort Motte, Calhoun County. It travels to the northwest and intersects U.S. Route 601 (US 601; Colonel Thomson Highway). The highway continues to the northwest and enters Fort Motte. There, it crosses over Buckhead Creek and a Norfolk Southern Railway railroad line. Immediately afterward, it meets its northern terminus, an intersection with the eastern terminus of Mosley Road and the western terminus of Town Square Street. Here, the roadway continues as Fort Motte Road.

Major intersections

See also

References

External links

SC 419 at Virginia Highways' South Carolina Highways Annex

419
Transportation in Calhoun County, South Carolina